The Pike River is a  river in the U.S. state of Wisconsin. It is a tributary of the Menominee River and its entire length is in  Marinette County.

The North and South Branch of the Pike River meet just above Dave's Falls near US 141 1 mile west of Amberg. From Dave's Falls the Pike River flows east and south to the Menominee River, joining it below the White Rapids Dam.

Notes

Rivers of Wisconsin
Rivers of Marinette County, Wisconsin